The Indian National Mineworkers' Federation (INMF) is a trade union representing miners in India.

History
The union was founded in 1949 on the initiative of the Indian National Trade Union Congress, bringing together numerous regional unions of miners.  It grew steadily, having 150,000 members by 1960, and 351,000 by 1997, at which time the federation had 139 affiliated unions.

By 2017, the union represented 40% of the workers for Coal India.

Leadership

General Secretaries
c.1960: Kanti Mehta
1980s: Sudhendu Das Gupta
c.1990: Bindeshwari Dubey
c.2000:  S. Q. Zama
Lalan Choubey

Presidents
1952: Michael John
1970s: Kanti Mehta
1980s: Bindeshwari Dubey
1990s: Sudhendu Das Gupta
c.2000: [Chandra Shekhar Dubey] Ex MP

References

Trade unions in India
Trade unions established in 1949
Mining trade unions
1949 establishments in India